The Revolt of Hasan Khan Salar was a revolt that occurred in Khorasan from 1846 to 1850. It began as a result of the power struggle in the Qajar court. One of the factions manifested itself in Khorasan by Hasan Khan Salar. Salar's revolt sought to promote Bahman Mirza and his claim to power.

The first half of his revolt started in 1846 and was initially very successful, gaining the support of rebellious Turkmen tribes and the Shadlu Kurds who had long hated Qajar rule. However, Salar was defeated at Mayamey near Bistam in August 1847 and was forced to flee first to Akhal and then later to Serakhs. This ended the first part of the rebellion. However, with the death of Mohammad Shah Qajar on 4 September 1848,  Salar was able to capture Mashhad with the support of the population and then extended his control over most of Khorasan. With the ascension of Naser al-Din Shah Qajar on 20 October, more attention was focused on crushing this revolt. After taking over several cities in the spring of 1849, government forces besieged Mashhad, resulting in its collapse in spring of 1850. Salar was executed shortly after.

Background

Court Rivalry 
After September 1845, Mohammad Shah Qajar was physically weakened, and rumors spread that Mohammad Shah was dying. This resulted in the Qajar court dissolving into multiple factions that fought with each other. One faction was led by Allah Yar Khan Asif al-Daula, the uncle of Mohammad Shah and governor of Khorasan. He despised the Grand Vizier, Hajji Mirza Aghasi, and wanted to take over his position. He failed and thus, he began to think of revolting. Asif al-Daula's son, Hasan Khan Salar, began to have ideas of his own and planned to seize Khorasan for himself. Mohammed Yusuf mentions that "Hasan Khan Salar, son of Asif al-Daulah, whose mother was the great-great-grandchild of Khaqan, Fath 'Ali Shah, got the idea of revolting, and chanted this verse repeatedly:

I am ashamed of this kind of life; That I be Salar (leader), and act like a slave.-Hasan Khan Salar

Volatile Situation in Khorasan 
Around this time the Tekke Turkmen began to raid around Mashhad with the support of the Jalayer tribe governing Kalat-e Naderi, which had remained independent since the beginning of Qajar rule over Khorasan. Jafar Qoli Khan Shadlu, the chieftain of the Shadlu Kurds, also assisted in raiding the vicinity of Mashhad. Asif al-Daula sent some retaliatory raids but they didn't do anything to discourage the khan.

Kalat-e Naderi was finally conquered by Hasan Khan Salar in the first half of 1846. This benefited Asif al-Daula but not the shah, because he had become a threat to Qajar rule in Khorasan and Hajji Mirza Aghasi planned to send troops there to strengthen the shah's authority there. Jafar Qoli Khan Shadlu, however, still refused to submit to the Shah and present himself at Tehran.

In the late summer of 1846 Asif al-Daula planned to invade Herat and depose Yar Mohammad Khan with the support of Mohammad Yusuf bin Malik Qasim Mirza and Shah Pasand Khan of Lash and Joveyn. However, Aghasi refused to authorize the plan, thinking it as an attempt for Asif al-Daula to gain more power.

Planning 
Salar began to think of forming a tribal army to conquer Khorasan and expelling the Qajars, using Kalat as a base. He formed a marriage alliance with Jafar Qoli Khan Shadlu. Asif al-Daula initially supported his son but changed his mind in 1847 when Salar began to take money from Asif's treasury in order to pay for troops.

Asif al-Daula managed to convince the Shah to make Hasan Khan Salar the governor of Khorasan and appoint himself as guardian of Mashhad. However, once the Shah fulfilled these requests, Asif al-Daula began to crush those who gave their allegiance directly to the Shah and ordered the execution of the governor of the Nardin district, Mohammad Hasan Khan.

This was the last straw, and Asif was ordered to set out for Tehran, which he did, and took 400,000 tuman with him. Mirza Muhammad Khan was sent to rule in Mashhad as a replacement. The governor of Bastam, Sulayman Khan, sent a 600-man force (composed of 500 riflemen, 100 cavalry, and two artillery pieces) with Mirza Muhammad Khan as an escort. Mirza Muhammad Khan then defected to Salar and joined him in rebelling against the Shah.

War

First Phase of the Conflict

Initial Successes 
Jafar Qoli Khan Shadlu and Hasan Khan Salar marched on Kalat and occupied it. When the news reached Asif al-Daula, he feared for his reputation and fled to go on pilgrimage in Mecca. He later went into exile in Karbala. Salar then marched to Sabzevar and took this place as well. Ibrahim Khalil Khan was sent with 6,000 men from Tehran to Khorasan to suppress the rebellion. On 22 August 1847 he arrived at Bastam and consulted with the governor of Bastam.

Defeat and Flight of Salar 
Ibrahim Khalil Khan was to face Jafar Qoli Khan Shadlu and he would retreat to Bastam if he failed. Ibrahim ended up beating Jafar in several battles, forcing them to retreat. Shortly after Salar arrived at Mazinan with 24-25,000 men and sent 1,000 cavalry to aid Jafar Qoli Khan Shadlu. Muhammad Qoli Khan arrived at Damghan with 4 regiments and 10 artillery and marched to aid Ibrahim Khalil Khan. 12,000 Khurasani cavalry made a surprise attack on Muhammad Ali Khan's camp but they were routed and fled to Salar's camp at Miami. At this point Salar knew he was defeated and when the Qajar soldiers tore his forces to shreds he and his supporters fled to Joveyn and intended to take sanctuary at Kalat, sending his son, Amir Aslan Khan, with his wealth there. However, the people of Kalat hated the Shadlu occupation of their territory so they rebelled and refused to let Amir Aslan Khan in. Hamza Mirza arrived in Buzanjird and appointed Muhammad Ali Khan Maku'i to govern the district. He then marched to Mashhad with Ibrahim Khalil Khan and arrived there in October. According to Hidayat, Qaen was reincorporated into government control shortly after this, but Noelle-Karimi suggests that it's more likely the Khozeimeh Amirdom managed to stay free from Salar until his resurgence in late 1848.

Renewed Attacks 
Salar then fled to Buzanjird but although it was a Shadlu stronghold the people sided against Salar so he fled to Akhal with Jafar Qoli Khan Shadlu. The chief of the Toqtamish Turkmens there, Qara Ughlan An Baygi, agreed to support him since he had brought 40,000 toman with him and offered to give some to the Turkmens. They then marched on Buzanjird with 10,000 cavalry, as Muhammad Ali Khan Maku'i had committed atrocities on the populace and thus the people welcomed Salar. When Hamza Mirza heard of this, he made the Zafaranlu Ilkhani governor of Buzanjird and marched there along with Muhammad Vali Khan Qajaq Na'ib. Salar and his allies fled and Hamza Mirza hoped the snow would stop their escape so he could crush them. Hamza Mirza then went to Maneh and encamped there for 40 days. On 13 December 1847 Jafar Qoli Khan tried to raid Hamza Mirza's camp at Maneh, but the raid was unsuccessful. The only gain from the battle was the capture of Lutf 'Ali Khan Bighayri, the commander of Qaleh Khan. He was sent to Akhal after the raid.

Fleeing to Sarakhs 
In the winter of 1847-1848 Salar left the Turkmens (supposedly due to internal conflicts between the Tuqutmash and Utmash) and fled to the ra'is of Sarakhs,  Arad/Araz/Uraz Khan Toqtamish Sarakhsi. Jafar Qoli Khan then laid an ambush in Gorgan, causing Hamza Mirza to send an Afshar and Khorasani force led by 'Abd Allah Khan Afshar Sayin Qal'ah. This force routed Jafar Qoli Khan Shadlu, causing him to flee to Herat in the hopes of seeking protection under Yar Mohammad Khan Alakozai. Hamza Mirza then launched an expedition against the Turkmens of Akhal and Gorgan, reportedly advancing 17 farsangs every day and taking 300 Turkmen prisoners. They were resettled in Samalqan due to the urging of Mir Sa'd Allah Fandarasaki. Shortly after this Hasan Khan Salar marched on Mashhad with 8,000 men, but was routed at Kal Yaquti, a suburb of Mashhad. Salar was then further defeated at Qarabaqa'ah (5 farsangs from Mashhad) and the Turkmen of Sarakhs defected.

Second Phase of the Conflict

Mashhad Rebellion and Death of Mohammad Shah 
Hamza Mirza had gotten ill and a power vacuum ensued in Mashhad. Mirza Muhammad Khan used this to forge alliances with local leaders and encite the people of Mashhad into revolting against the Qajars. At the same time Qajar troops in Mashhad (in particular the Turkic regiments as well as those of Hamadan) had harmed the local population and became increasingly unpopular within the city. The city finally exploded on 25 August 1848 with the support of the local ulema. The populace massacred government officials and soldiers (around 700 according to Mojtahed-Zadeh) and besieged Hamza Mirza in the citadel. When Hasan Khan Salar became aware of this, he marched on Mashhad with 2,000 Turkmen. Villages up to 10 farsangs away from Mashhad joined Salar and the population welcomed him and the recently returned Jafar Qoli Khan Shadlu. The death of Mohammad Shah Qajar on 4 September only made the situation worse. Hamza Mirza began to run out of supplies.

Intervention of Yar Mohammad Khan Alakozai 
Fortunately for Hamza Mirza, he was soon to be rescued from his predicament. The ruler of Herat, Yar Mohammad Khan Alakozai, seemed like a supporter of Hasan Khan Salar from the outside. He had even given Jafar Qoli Khan Shadlu protection. Both sides had asked for the support of Yar Mohammad. Eventually Yar Mohammad marched on Mashhad with 2,000 troops or 19,000 infantry and cavalry and 4 artillery pieces. The chief Mujtahid of Mashhad tried to discourage Hamza Mirza from asking for Afghan assistance because they were Sunnis, but Hamza Mirza refused his request.

There are two stories of the events in Mashhad. The first story is told by Mohamed Yusuf. Yusuf states that the Afghans entered the city and Salar's troops left. The Qajar forces still in the Arg of Mashhad arrayed their forces facing the Afghans. Yar Mohammad then asked the nobles of Herat which side to choose. One of them made a speech suggesting the Afghans side with the government and fire on Salar's troops. Yar Mohammad was convinced by this and began to jointly attack the Afghans with the help of Hamza Mirza's forces in the citadel.

The other story, told by Fayz Muhammad, says that Jafar Qoli Khan Shadlu convinced Yar Mohammad to march to Mashhad to aid Salar. However, he sent a letter to Hamza Mirza, saying he was there to aid him and would not join the side of Salar. A dispute arose over where the Afghan army would camp and when rumors spread of Hamza Mirza and Yar Mohammad's alliance Salar warned Yar Mohammad that if he tried to link up with the Qajars in the citadel they would use force to stop it. Yar Mohammad then manipulated Jafar Qoli Khan Shadlu, claiming "I must first go to the citadel and take possession of it. Only then can I enter the city with an easy mind.” Jafar Qoli Khan consented and although the people of Mashhad attempted to stop Hamza Mirza and Yar Mohammad from linking up they ultimately failed in this attempt. Yar Mohammad was able to take Jafar Qoli Khan prisoner.

However the allies suffered a drawback a few days later with 700 killed and 300 wounded, and it became clear their situation in the city was unmaintainable. Hamza Mirza and Yar Mohammad withdrew to Herat. Some surviving soldiers managed to escape to Tehran. Yar Mohammad Khan also occupied Jam and Khaf in an attempt to expel the rebels. Hamza would winter near Ghourian from middle-late December 1848 until late February 1849 or late March-early April 1849. On the way there, Jafar Qoli Khan proposed that they release him and in exchange he would help them withdraw. When Jafar Qoli Khan was released but didn't fulfill his promise, Hamza Mirza and Yar Mohammad Khan Alakozai destroyed the fortifications of Mashhad and disabled the artillery. When they reached Jam, they besieged Fariman fort because the commander, Bahadur Khan, had captured several of Yar Mohammad Khan's men on his march to Mashhad. On 15 November 1848 he surrendered and agreed to supply the retreating army.

Qajar Counterattack and Defections 
With the departure of Hamza Mirza, Hasan Khan Salar was able to drastically extend his power. He conquered Sabzevar, Torshiz, Joveyn, Buzanjird, Qaen, Esfarayn, and Torbat-e Haidari. Amir Asadollah Khan of Qaen saw that his forces couldn't defend the region from Salar anymore. Instead of facing punishment by the Qajar forces, he fled to Herat. His son Alam Khan was captured for a brief period but later managed to escape to his father in Herat. The reign of Salar over Qaen was cruel and a mullah who was friendly towards Asadollah Khan was blown from a gun because he continued to preach Asadollah Khan during his sermons. Nishapur under Imamverdi Khan Bayat had resisted Salar even though he was applying substantial pressure on the city. With the crowning of Nasir al-Din on October 20, Tehran was anxious to resolve the conflict. Sultan Murad Mirza was sent with a force of 7,000 and 4 artillery pieces to reconquer Khorasan.  Yar Mohammad sent 1,000 troops under Jabbar Khan Alakozai to aid Murad Mirza. As a result he gained the favour of the shah and Nasir al-Din gave the Heratis 4 cannons in recognition of their help. Yar Mohammad also received the title of Zahir-al Daula.

The royal forces were dependent on the Zafaranlu Kurds for aid, as it was the middle of winter. However, Jafar Qoli Khan Shadlu was afraid of the wrath of the state and submitted to the Qajars. He left Khorasan for Tehran on 25 January 1849. Many other khans defected as well. During February Hasan Khan Salar lost control over Qaen, Torshiz, Torbat-e Haidari, and Joveyn. Salar attempted to stop the Qajar force at Joveyn, however he was routed and 200 of his men were killed in the battle. Shortly after this, Sabzevar, which was besieged shortly before the Battle of Joveyn, fell on March 9. Mirza Muhammad Khan was taken prisoner. Qajar forces reportedly committed atrocities during the siege of Sabzevar, which would only further strengthen the resolve of the people of Mashhad to resist government forces. Sultan Murad Mirza then marched on Nishapur and reached the city on March 21. Imamverdi Khan Bayat welcomed Sultan Murad Mirza into Nishapur.

Siege of Mashhad and Execution of Salar

Attempt at Negotiations 
The royal court sent Charagh 'Ali Khan Zanganeh to Mashhad to negotiate with Hasan Khan Salar. Reportedly, Zanganeh offered Salar 95,000 tuman and the governorship of Hamadan, Zanjan, and Qazvin if he were to unconditionally surrender. However, Hasan Khan Salar refused unconditional surrender and made negotiation impossible. He also had the support of the regional Afshar, Turkmen, and Hazara tribes. As mentioned before, the people of Mashhad were extremely loyal to Salar due to their hatred of the government. Reportedly, even beggars would arm themselves during the siege to defend the city from government forces. Sultan Murad Mirza sent Nawab Mu'azzam Sulayman Khan Darah Khabri to capture Kalat while he marched toward Mashhad and besieged it in June. 10,000 of Salar's forces marched out to do battle with them but were heavily defeated and retreated back into the city.

Fall of Mashhad 
Hasan Khan Salar's forces suffered defeat after defeat. His soldiers had no money and so he had an idea and decided to sack the Imam Reza Shrine to confiscate the ornaments to pay for his troops. So in October 1849 he did so, and 22,000 toman fell into his hands. This action made him increasingly unpopular within the city. He also put the ulema of Mashhad in prison because they had not issued a fatwa approving of his actions. Salar's forces also committed atrocities on the local population. They stole the property of locals, raped women, and sold citizens to the Turkmen slavers. Two more Qajar armies reached the walls at Mashhad and by this time the people were tired of Salar. On 13 March or 23 March 1850, Mashhad surrendered to the Qajars, ending Hasan Khan Salar's 4 year long revolt. Hasan Khan Salar, his son Amir Aslan Khan, and Salar's brother Muhammad Ali Khan Qajar Develu were executed on April 29. Mirza Muhammad Khan was executed on May 21. Sultan Murad Mirza was given the title Husam al-Saltana for crushing the rebellion.

Sources 
 Yusuf, Mohamed. (1988) A History of Afghanistan, from 1793 A.D., to 1865 A.D. New York University,  pp. 98–148
 Noelle-Karimi, Christine. (2014) The Pearl In It's Midst: Herat and the mapping of Khurasan (15th-19th centuries). Austrian Academy of Sciences   pg. 191 and pp. 227–230
 McChesney, Robert; Khorrami, Mohammad Mehdi. (2012) The History of Afghanistan (6 vol. set): Fayż Muḥammad Kātib Hazārah's Sirāj al-tawārīkh. BRILL  pp. 207–209
Mojtahed-Zadeh, Pirouz. (1993) Evolution of Eastern Iranian boundaries: Role of the Khozeimeh Amirdom of Qaenat and Sistan. PhD thesis. SOAS University of London.
 Amanat, Abbas (2005). The Pivot of the Universe: Nasir al-Din Shah and the Iranian Monarchy, 1831-1896. I.B.Tauris  pp. 114–115
 Algar, Hamid (1989). AMĪR KABĪR, MĪRZĀ TAQĪ KHAN Encyclopædia Iranica.

References 

Revolts
Qajar Iran
History of Khorasan
19th century in Iran
History of Semnan Province
History of Golestan Province